Nickel tungstate is an inorganic compound of nickel, tungsten and oxygen, with the chemical formula of NiWO4.

Preparation

Nickel tungstate can be prepared by the reaction of nickel(II) nitrate and sodium tungstate:

Ni(NO3)2 + Na2WO4 → NiWO4 + 2 NaNO3

Nickel tungstate can also be prepared by the reaction of nickel(II) oxide and tungsten(VI) oxide.

It can also be obtained by the reaction of ammonium metatungstate and nickel(II) nitrate or from the reaction of sodium tungstate, nickel(II) chloride and sodium chloride.

Nickel tungstate undergoes a phase transition at 700°C.

Properties 

Nickel tungstate is a light brown, odourless solid that is insoluble in water. The amorphous form is green and the polycrystalline form is brown. It crystallizes in the wolframite crystal structure of the monoclinic crystal system with space group P2/c (No. 13). The compound is electrochromic and antiferromagnetic.

Applications

Nickel tungstate has no commercial uses. It has been examined as a photocatalyst, in humidity sensors, and in dielectric resonators. It is also considered as a "promising" cathode material for asymmetric supercapacitors.

Other compounds 
Nickel tungstate forms compounds with ammonia, such as NiWO4·2NH3·H2O which are cyan crystals, NiWO4·4NH3 which are green crystals, NiWO4·5NH3·H2O as dark blue crystals or anhydrous NiWO4·6NH3 which is crystalline purple, while the octahydrate of hexamine is dark blue.

References

Nickel compounds
Tungstates